Delaware is a city in Delaware County, Iowa, United States. The population was 142 at the time of the 2020 census.

History
Delaware was platted in 1860, shortly after the Dubuque and Pacific Railroad was built through the neighborhood.

Geography
Delaware is located at  (42.473959, -91.342283).

Demographics

2010 census
As of the census of 2010, there were 159 people, 82 households, and 41 families living in the city. The racial makeup of the city was 99.4% White and 0.6% from two or more races. Hispanic or Latino of any race were 0.6% of the population.

There were 82 households, of which 18.3% had children under the age of 18 living with them, 39.0% were married couples living together, 4.9% had a female householder with no husband present, 6.1% had a male householder with no wife present, and 50.0% were non-families. 40.2% of all households were made up of individuals, and 18.3% had someone living alone who was 65 years of age or older. The average household size was 1.94 and the average family size was 2.54.

The median age in the city was 48.7 years. 15.7% of residents were under the age of 18; 6.9% were between the ages of 18 and 24; 20.1% were from 25 to 44; 37.1% were from 45 to 64; and 20.1% were 65 years of age or older. The gender makeup of the city was 54.7% male and 45.3% female.

2000 census
As of the census of 2000, there were 188 people, 78 households, and 51 families living in the city. The racial makeup of the city was 98.94% White, and 1.06% from two or more races. Hispanic or Latino of any race were 1.06% of the population.

There were 78 households, out of which 32.1% had children under the age of 18 living with them, 51.3% were married couples living together, 11.5% had a female householder with no husband present, and 34.6% were non-families. 26.9% of all households were made up of individuals, and 11.5% had someone living alone who was 65 years of age or older. The average household size was 2.41 and the average family size was 2.82.

In the city, the population was spread out, with 29.3% under the age of 18, 5.9% from 18 to 24, 31.9% from 25 to 44, 22.3% from 45 to 64, and 10.6% who were 65 years of age or older. The median age was 35 years. For every 100 females, there were 100.0 males. For every 100 females age 18 and over, there were 98.5 males.

The median income for a household in the city was $36,875, and the median income for a family was $40,694. Males had a median income of $31,250 versus $21,875 for females. The per capita income for the city was $18,361. None of the families and 4.4% of the population were living below the poverty line, including no under eighteens and 16.7% of those over 64.

Education
The Maquoketa Valley Community School District operates local area public schools.

References

Cities in Iowa
Cities in Delaware County, Iowa
1860 establishments in Iowa